Aratus of Soli was a Greek didactic poet. "Aratus" may also refer to:
Aratus of Sicyon (271–213 BC), an ancient Greek statesman, sixteen times strategos of the Achaean League
Aratus the Younger of Sicyon, son of the previous and strategos of the Achaean League 219/18 BC.
Aratus III of Sicyon, grandson of Aratus of Sicyon and ambassador of the Achaean League
 Aratus of Cnidus, the author of a history of Egypt, now lost
Aratus, son of Asclepius
Aratus pisonii, a crab of American mangroves
Äratus, a 1989 Soviet-Estonian film